John Hackman Sumner,  (27 May 192424 May 2013)  was an English-born director and producer and theatre impresario, who was the founder and artistic director of Melbourne Theatre Company in Australia, gathering a group of later internationally famous stars including Ray Lawler, Zoe Caldwell, Barry Humphries and Fred Parslow.

Biography

Sumner was born in England in May 1924. At an early age he attended the National Opera Studio (known then as London Opera Studio). He served in the British Merchant Navy in World War II before commencing his career in theatre in 1947 in Dundee, Scotland as assistant stage manager. He later became stage director and manager with H. M. Tennent Theatres in the west end of London before emigrating to Australia in 1952. In 1959, he married actress Patsy King.

In 1953, Sumner established the Union Theatre Repertory Company (UTRC), which later became the Melbourne Theatre Company, where he served as artistic director until 1955. After a short time in Sydney managing the Australian Elizabethan Theatre Trust he returned to Melbourne and resumed his role as artistic director in 1959, continuing until 1987. 

He directed more than a hundred plays from Australia and overseas and having established the Melbourne Theatre company as a model for other state theatre companies.

Death
Sumner died in Melbourne on 24 May 2013, at the age of 88. He was survived by two daughters, Alice and Victoria.
John also had a son, Justin, by his first wife, Karis Mond, granddaughter of the ICI founder Ludwig Mond, Lord Melchet. Justin Sumner currently lives in Cornwall.

Honours and awards
He was appointed Commander of the British Empire in 1971 and was made an Officer of the Order of Australia in 1985.

In 2009, the main performance space in the Melbourne Theatre Company's Southbank Theatre was named in his honour.

Helpmann Awards
The Helpmann Awards is an awards show, celebrating live entertainment and performing arts in Australia, presented by industry group Live Performance Australia (LPA) since 2001. In 2004, Sumner received the JC Williamson Award, the LPA's highest honour, for their life's work in live performance.

|-
| 2004 || Himself || JC Williamson Award || 
|-

References

1924 births
2013 deaths
Australian theatre directors
Officers of the Order of Australia
Australian Commanders of the Order of the British Empire
British Merchant Navy personnel of World War II
British emigrants to Australia
Helpmann Award winners